Jay Burton (born 25 October 1972) is an Australian rules footballer. He played as a ruckman and began his football career at Subiaco.

Football career
He didn't play a senior AFL game, playing instead for Richmond reserves and Oakleigh Football Club in the Victorian Football Association (VFA). He returned to Subiaco to play in the West Australian Football League (WAFL) in 1994. At the end of the year he was recruited to be an inaugural squad member of the Fremantle, along with his older brother, Matthew. He only played two games for Fremantle, both of which were when his brother was out of the team. He performed well for Subiaco, however, being selected to represent Western Australia in the interstate match against Queensland, and finishing equal ninth in the 1995 Sandover Medal.

After suffering repeated dislocated knee injuries, he was delisted by Fremantle at the end of the 1995 season.  However, after surgery, he was re-drafted in the 1995 national draft.  He wouldn't fully recover, and wouldn't play a senior game for neither Fremantle nor Subiaco in 1996.  He was again delisted by Fremantle at the end of the 1996 season.  Recovering for the 1997 season, he was named captain of Subiaco, but a broken jaw and further knee injuries would restrict him to playing only four games for Subiaco in 1997.

His father, Peter, also played for and captained Subiaco, including being a member of their 1973 WANFL Premiership winning team. He was the Subiaco coach in 1979 and part of 1980.  A younger brother, Travis, also played for Subiaco and was drafted by West Coast in the 1992 AFL draft, but did not play an AFL game.

References

External links

Jay Burton's WAFL statistics
Jay Burton's VFA statistics

1972 births
Living people
Fremantle Football Club players
Oakleigh Football Club players
Subiaco Football Club players
Australian rules footballers from Perth, Western Australia